Jesper Knudsen may refer to:
 Jesper Knudsen (painter)
 Jesper Knudsen (badminton)
 Jesper Knudsen (speedway rider)